Udrești may refer to several villages in Romania:

 Udrești, a village in Ulmi Commune, Dâmbovița County
 Udrești, a village in Apostolache Commune, Prahova County
 Udrești, a village in Dănicei Commune, Vâlcea County

See also 
 Urdești
 Urdeș
 Udrea (surname)